Phil Roman Entertainment is an independent animation studio, founded in 1999 by Film Roman founder Phil Roman.

Films and series 
 Grandma Got Run Over by a Reindeer
 El Americano: The Movie – Co-produced by Animex Producciones and Olmos Productions

References

External links 
 Official Phil Roman Entertainment website

American animation studios
Entertainment companies established in 1999
Mass media companies established in 1999
Film Roman
1999 establishments in the United States